= Kurdistan Institution for Strategic Studies and Scientific Research =

Research institute in Sulaymaniyan, Iraq

Kurdistan Institution for Strategic Studies and Scientific Research (KISSR)
- دەستەى كوردستانى بۆ دراساتى ستراتيجى و توێژينەوەى زانستى
- Other names: KISSR
- Type: Public
- Established: 2008
- President: Prof. Dr. Shwan Kamal Rachid
- Location: Sulaymaniyah, Kurdistan Regional Government-Iraq
- Website: www.kissr.edu.iq

Kurdistan Institution for Strategic Studies and Scientific Research (KISSR; دەستەى كوردستانى بۆ دراساتى ستراتيجى و توێژينەوەى زانستى) is a public institution located in the city of Sulaymaniyah in Kurdistan Region - Iraq. It is one of the important scientific and cultural institution in Kurdistan region as well as Iraq which is specialized for scientific research and strategy studies.

The aim of Kurdistan Institution for Strategic Studies and Scientific Research (KISSR) are to conduct researches in the fields of pure sciences, engineering, medical sciences, and strategic studies.

== History ==
Kurdistan Institution for Strategic Studies and Scientific Research (KISSR) was founded in 2005 under the name of Kurdistan Technology and Research Centres with the support of Kurdistan Regional Government and the Ministry of Higher Education and Scientific Research. In the late of 2008, it was re-established under the name of Kurdistan Institution for Strategic Studies and Scientific Research (KISSR).

In 2024, Prof. Dr. Shwan Kamal Rachid succeeded Dr. Polla Khanaqa as the current president of the Kurdistan Institution for Strategic Studies and Scientific Research (KISSR). His appointment reflects a commitment to advancing the institution's mission through his extensive experience in academia and leadership in research.

The Vision of KISSR is

• As a scientific and higher education institution, KISSR strives to become a main and impactful center in addressing and fulfilling local and global needs and challenges through conducting strategic studies and cutting-edge research.

• Lead in raising scientific research and innovation in the Kurdistan Region and Iraq through strengthening research culture and promoting informing decision making with data and research findings.

The Missions of KISSR are

• Conducting strategic studies and cutting-edge research on pressing and future-oriented matters of local and global importance.

• Developing advanced research capacities and promoting responsible research ethics.

• Developing reliable data banks to encourage and support local and international researchers in conducting scientific research related to the Kurdistan Region and Iraq.

• Developing a network to support local researchers and connect them with each other and with esteemed international researchers and research centers.

• Respecting and adhering to the principles of human rights, multiculturalism, openness, and democracy in undertaking projects and activities.

== Research centers ==
There are currently four active research centers in Kurdistan Institution in variety of fields, which are:

No	Research Center	Departments	Founded
1	Research Centre of Geology & Organic Petrology	Department of Mineralogy Department of Geology Department of Organic Petrology Department of Geochemistry	2008
2	Research Centre of Microbiology and Health	Department of Microbiology Department of Molecular Biology Department of Health	2008
3	Research Centre of Quality Control, Environment, and Agriculture	Department of Water & Food Control Department of Environment	2008
4	Research Centre of Strategic Studies	Strategic Studies Statistics	2011

== Directorates and departments ==
In addition, In addition, Kurdistan Institution includes the following directorates and departments:

- Directorate of Information technology
- Directorate of Health and Safety
- Directorate of Anti-fascism and Terrorism
- Department of Academic Journals and Magazines
- Department of Postgraduate Studies
- Department of Relations
- Department of Quality Assurance
- Department of Media
